Shantir Rani Church (queen of peace) is a pro cathedral church situated in  Mariam Nagar, Agartala, India. Church serves as a parish church for the Shantir Rani parish in the Roman Catholic diocese of Agartala.

See also
List of cathedrals in India

References

Churches in Agartala
Roman Catholic churches in India
20th-century Roman Catholic church buildings in India
1939 establishments in India